For One Pagan Brotherhood is the first full-length album by Argentine pagan metal, folk metal band Tersivel. The album was released on February 26, 2011 through Trinacria Media.

Background
Cruzat Beer House, mentioned in track 12, was an Irish craft beer pub in Buenos Aires, Argentina.

Track listing

Personnel
Tersivel
Lian Gerbino – vocals, electric guitar, acoustic guitar, bass, bodhram
Nicolas Närgrath  – growls, electric guitar
Franco Robert – keyboards, piano
Additional musicians and production
 Xandru Reguera – Irish bouzouki, additional acoustic guitar
 The Drunken Choir – choir, backing vocals
 V. Fernandez – drums
 Nicolas Närgrath – sound engineer
 Franco Robert – sound engineer
 Lian Gerbino – sound engineer, audio mixing, mastering

References

2011 albums
Tersivel albums